Gerald Francis McCarthy (born 30 June 1958) is an Australian politician. He was a Labor member of the Northern Territory Legislative Assembly, holding the seat of Barkly from the 2008 general election until he retired at the 2020 election. He was Minister for Housing and Community Development, Minister for Essential Services and Minister for Public Employment in the Gunner Ministry from September 2016 to 2020.

|}

McCarthy also held several ministries in Paul Henderson's cabinet: on 9 February 2009 he joined the cabinet as Minister for Transport and Minister for Correctional Services. On 6 August, he gained the additional portfolios of Arts and Museums, Senior Territorians, Young Territorians, and Minister Assisting the Chief Minister on Multicultural Affairs and Education. From 4 December 2009 to the defeat of the Henderson government at the 2012 Northern Territory election, he was Minister for Lands and Planning, Transport, Construction, Correctional Services, and Arts and Museums. McCarthy retired at 2020 election, and the Country Liberal Party won the seat.

References

1958 births
Living people
Members of the Northern Territory Legislative Assembly
Australian Labor Party members of the Northern Territory Legislative Assembly
21st-century Australian politicians